The Kunsthalle Bern is a Kunsthalle (art exposition hall) on the Helvetiaplatz in Bern, Switzerland.

It was built in 1917–1918 by the Kunsthalle Bern Association and opened on October 5, 1918. Since then, it has been the site of numerous expositions of contemporary art. The Kunsthalle gained international renown with expositions by artists such as Paul Klee, Christo, Alberto Giacometti, Henry Moore, Jasper Johns, Sol LeWitt, Gregor Schneider, Bruce Nauman and Daniel Buren, and with thematic expositions such as Harald Szeemann's Live In Your Head: When Attitudes Become Form (1969).

On the occasion of its 50th anniversary the Kunsthalle Bern became the first building ever to be wrapped entirely by Christo and Jeanne-Claude in July 1968.

Directors
 1918 – 1930: Robert Kieser
 1931 – 1946: Max Huggler
 1946 – 1955: Arnold Rüdlinger
 1955 – 1961: Franz Meyer
 1961 – 1969: Harald Szeemann
 1970 – 1974: Carlo Huber
 1974 – 1982: Johannes Gachnang
 1982 – 1985: Jean-Hubert Martin
 1985 – 1997: Ulrich Loock
 1997 – 2005: Bernhard Fibicher
 2005 – 2011: Philippe Pirotte
 2012 – 2014: Fabrice Stroun
 2015 – 2022: Valérie Knoll
 2022: Kabelo Malatsie

Literature
 Jean-Christophe Ammann / Harald Szeemann, Von Hodler zur Antiform. Geschichte der Kunsthalle Bern, Bern 1970.
 Hans Rudolf Reust, Aus dem Musée éclaté an den Ort des Werks, Kunsthalle Bern 1969-1993, Bern 1993,

References 

Contemporary art galleries in Switzerland
Museums in Bern
Art galleries established in 1918
1918 establishments in Switzerland